Frederick Towne Mall was a mall located in Frederick, Maryland, United States.  The mall opened in 1972 on U.S. Route 40 along the "Golden Mile". It was closed in April 2013, except for two anchor stores, Boscov's and Home Depot. In November 2019 it was announced that the mall would be renamed District 40 and would become an entertainment center with a movie theater, and possibly a trampoline park, video arcade, go-karts and bowling alley.

History
Frederick Towne Mall was first announced in 1970; early plans called for the mall to be between 350,000 to 400,000 square feet, but plans were later pushed to 630,000 square feet, with a central second floor for service tenants. An opening date was set for April 1971. By March 1971, anchors had been announced to include Montgomery Ward, J.C. Penney, and Everley's, with Wards set to open in fall 1971, followed by the rest of the mall "in about a year". Other tenants announced included McCrory's, Peoples Drug, Thom McAn, RadioShack, Foxwood Casuals, Chess King, General Nutrition Centers, Kay Jewelers, and Walden Books.

The area surrounding the mall eventually intensified with low income housing, as did violent crime in the surrounding area.  After a series of well-publicized events earned the mall a reputation for crime and frequent fights, mall tenants began relocating to a safer retail district across the city near the competing Francis Scott Key Mall, which opened in 1978.

The Montgomery Ward store closed in 2001 due to bankruptcy and later to be replaced in 2004 by The Home Depot. The then vacant J.C.Penney was replaced with Boscov's in 2003. In 2005, Gentlemen's Choice, the last remaining original tenant, moved out.

In 2006, proposals were made to redevelop the mall into a mixed use site.  However, by 2009, economic issues caused by the Great Recession ended the possibility of mixed use redevelopment for the time.

By 2007, the reputation for crime the mall gained increased, as a woman was robbed and beaten while exiting the Bon-Ton department store. This reputation would only grow further when the Hoyts Cinema 10 was closed in 2008 after a man was stabbed to death inside.  Because of this, Frederick residents relocated their dollars to the safer side of town, near the Francis Scott Key Mall.

In November 2010, it was announced that the Bon-Ton store and their furniture gallery would be closing within the next few months. They closed in January 2011, leaving the mall without any original anchor stores. John's Hallmark, the last interior tenant, closed its doors in April 2013; however by this time it was selling merchandise out of its back door due to the closure of the mall's interior to the public in early April. At this time, it was announced that Walmart had plans to open on the site, following demolition of the mall, however these plans were cancelled in 2016.

In 2014, just a year after the closure of the mall, three men were charged with burglary and trespassing after breaking into the mall by prying one of its doors. Officers went inside and arrested the three men. Their motive for breaking into the mall remains unclear.

Since 2015, the land has been planned for redevelopment. In 2016, work started on a redevelopment called Frederick Towne Center. Boscov's and Home Depot will be kept and the mall in between demolished. The new site plan would include a Walmart of size 155,000-square-foot. In September of that year, however, Walmart cancelled their plans for redevelopment.

Shortly afterwards, the owner of the property considered selling the mall. On November 23, 2016, there was an auction for the site between December 6 to 8 with a starting bid of $2.5 million.  On February 24, 2017, the property was sold to a private investment company, headed by urologist Mohammed Mohiuddin.

District 40
On November 11, 2019 it was officially announced that the mall was being renamed District 40 and may include tenants with business such as go-karts, a bowling alley, a video arcade, a trampoline park, and restaurants. According to the report, Home Depot, which is connected to the old mall, is technically not included in the property and Boscov's still has a lease, but no further details were disclosed about the future of the store.

Warehouse Cinemas would be the first tenant of District 40, opening in summer of 2020. In July 2020, Taj Mahal opened in the former Ground Round site.

References

External links
 Drone Flies Through The Abandon Frederick Towne Mall
Ode To Days Gone By

1972 establishments in Maryland
2013 disestablishments in Maryland
Defunct shopping malls in the United States
Shopping malls in Maryland
Shopping malls established in 1972
Shopping malls disestablished in 2013